Maurandya wislizeni is a scrambling or climbing herbaceous annual native to Mexico and the south western United States (Texas, Arizona and New Mexico) where it grows in sand dunes. It has tubular flowers in shades of blue to violet and white and more-or-less triangular untoothed leaves. It has been placed in a separate genus as Epixiphium wislizeni.

The epithet wislizeni commemorates Friedrich Adolph Wislizenus. It is regularly misspelt "wislizenii".

References

Plantaginaceae
Plants described in 1859